Vetle Langedahl (born 30 October 1996) is a Norwegian politician for the Conservative Party.

In 2015 he became deputy member of Hammerfest municipal council and member of Finnmark county council. He commenced studies at the University of Tromsø, and in 2017 he had to withdraw from his political positions, as he no longer had residence in Hammerfest.

He served as a deputy representative to the Parliament of Norway from Finnmark during the term 2017–2021.

References

1996 births
Living people
People from Hammerfest
Mayors of Hammerfest
Deputy members of the Storting
Conservative Party (Norway) politicians
Finnmark politicians